The 2013 UTEP Miners football team represented the University of Texas at El Paso in the 2013 NCAA Division I FBS football season. This was the first year for head coach Sean Kugler both with UTEP and overall. He replaced retiring Mike Price after 9 years with UTEP (2004–2012) and 43 years as a head coach overall. They were a member of the West Division of Conference USA. The Miners played their home games in El Paso, Texas at the Sun Bowl Stadium. UTEP averaged 28,375 fans per game.

Schedule

Schedule Source:

References

UTEP
UTEP Miners football seasons
UTEP Miners football